Anbar-e Maran (also Romanized as Anbār-e Mārān; also known as Anbār-e Mīānī and Anbār-e Vasaţ) is a village in Chaldoran-e Jonubi Rural District, in the Central District of Chaldoran County, West Azerbaijan Province, Iran. At the 2006 census, its population was 176, in 27 families.

References 

Populated places in Chaldoran County